The Arkansas Razorbacks football statistical leaders are individual statistical leaders of the Arkansas Razorbacks football program in various categories, including passing, rushing, receiving, total offense, defensive stats, and kicking. Within those areas, the lists identify single-game, single-season, and career leaders. The Razorbacks represent the University of Arkansas in the NCAA's Southeastern Conference.

Although Arkansas began competing in intercollegiate football in 1894, the school's official record book considers the "modern era" to have begun in 1945. Records from before this year are often incomplete and inconsistent, and they are generally not included in these lists.

These lists are dominated by more recent players for several reasons:
 Since 1945, seasons have increased from 10 games to 11 and then 12 games in length.
 The NCAA didn't allow freshmen to play varsity football until 1972 (with the exception of the World War II years), allowing players to have four-year careers.
 Bowl games only began counting toward single-season and career statistics in 2002. The Razorbacks have played in 10 bowl games since this decision, allowing players on those teams to accumulate statistics for an additional game. Similarly, the SEC instituted a championship game in 1992. The Razorbacks have played in this championship game three times.
 The 10 Razorback seasons with the highest total offensive output (by yards) have come since 2000.

These lists are updated through the end of the 2019 season.

Passing

Passing Yards

Passing Touchdowns

Rushing

Rushing Yards

Rushing Touchdowns

Receiving

Receptions

Receiving Yards

Receiving Touchdowns

Total offense
Total offense is the sum of passing and rushing statistics. It does not include receiving or returns.

Total offense yards

Touchdowns responsible for
"Touchdowns responsible for" is the NCAA's official term for combined passing and rushing touchdowns.

Defense

Interceptions

Tackles

Sacks

Kicking

Field goals made

Field goal percentage

References

Lists of college football statistical leaders by team